The King Edward VI Foundation, Birmingham is a charitable institution that operates two independent schools, six selective academy state schools and four non-selective academy schools in Birmingham, England.

It was registered under the name The Schools of King Edward VI in Birmingham as a charity in November 1963. In 2019/20 it had a gross income of approximately £21 million, much of which is derived from extensive land holdings in the centre of Birmingham. The Multi-Academy Trust (King Edward VI Academy Trust Birmingham) has a further income of approximately £47 million.

The beneficiary schools are as follows:

Independent
King Edward's School, Birmingham (boys)
King Edward VI High School for Girls

Grammar Academies
King Edward VI Aston School (boys)
King Edward VI Camp Hill School for Boys
King Edward VI Camp Hill School for Girls  
King Edward VI Five Ways School (mixed)
King Edward VI Handsworth Grammar School for Boys
King Edward VI Handsworth School (girls)

Non-selective Academies
King Edward VI Balaam Wood Academy
King Edward VI Handsworth Wood Girls' Academy
King Edward VI Northfield School for Girls
King Edward VI Sheldon Heath Academy

History
On 28 October 1382, a chantry to say masses for the dead was established in New Street, Birmingham. As part of the religious settlement of King Henry VIII laws were enacted suppressing all monasteries and chantries. In the case of chantries, little had occurred since the 1545 Act and when King Edward VI came to the throne in 1547, new legislation to close chantries was soon enacted. Part of the process of suppressing chantries involved holding an inquiry into their property and assets. The New Street chantry was abolished in common with thousands of others, although the people of Birmingham were told that the assets would not be seized by the Crown but made available for educational purposes. When the assets still had not been returned to the town, a meeting was held in St Martin's Church, the Bull Ring, Birmingham, to petition the Crown to build a school in New Street on the land formerly occupied by the chantry. This was approved and the following year, King Edward VI School was opened. Owning land in the very centre of Birmingham gave it a secure financial base. In 1883, five new King Edward schools were created to meet the educational needs of the expanding population of the city of Birmingham.

Due to financial difficulties, many of the schools were forced to sell the land of their original location to buy the cheaper land from the surrounding area in the city. Many of the schools have hence changed location since their founding, with only Aston remaining in its original buildings.

In September 2017, the previously independent Handsworth Grammar School joined the foundation, becoming King Edward VI Handsworth Grammar School for Boys.

Foundation Service 
Since the expansion of the Foundation in 1883, once per year, year 7 pupils from within each school in the Foundation meet at The Great Hall within the University of Birmingham for a service to commemorate the founding of the King Edward VI Foundation. Historically at this service, pupils read from The Bible, sang hymns, and are told the story of the creation of the Foundation. More recently, pupils engage in musical performances, short plays and reciting poems.

Sources
King Edward's School, Birmingham, Tony Trott, 2001, 
King Edward High School Birmingham 1883–1983, Rachel Waterhouse, 1983
King Edward Grammar School for Girls, Handsworth 1883–1983, Alison Thorne, 1983
King Edward VI Five Ways 1883-1983, David Wheeldon, 1983
Victoria County History of England, Volume on Warwickshire, article by Tyson, J.C.

References

External links
The Grammar Schools of King Edward the Sixth in Birmingham
The Foundation of King Edward the Sixth in Birmingham

King Edward VI Aston Home page
King Edward VI Five Ways Home page
King Edward VI Sheldon Heath Academy Home page

Education in Birmingham, West Midlands
Educational foundations
Educational institutions established in the 1550s
Charities based in Birmingham, West Midlands
1963 establishments in England
King Edward VI Schools